The 2022 Wawa 250 Powered by Coca-Cola was the 23rd stock car race of the 2022 NASCAR Xfinity Series, and the 21st iteration of the event. Due to inclement weather, the first half of the race was held on Friday, August 26, 2022, and the second half was held on Saturday, August 27, in Daytona Beach, Florida at Daytona International Speedway, a  permanent D-shaped superspeedway. The race was increased from 100 laps to 118 laps, due to several NASCAR overtime finishes. In a chaotic and wreck filled race, Jeremy Clements, driving for his family team, Jeremy Clements Racing, scored the upset win after taking the lead when the final caution came out on the last lap. This was Clements' second career NASCAR Xfinity Series win, and his first of the season. Ironically, it was also the same date that Clements won his first Xfinity Series race, the 2017 Johnsonville 180. Noah Gragson mainly dominated the race, leading 52 laps before being wrecked out. The final podium consisted of Timmy Hill, who finished a career best 2nd place finish for MBM Motorsports. Despite damage to the front of his car, A. J. Allmendinger, driving for Kaulig Racing, would finish in 3rd. The rest of the top 10 consisted of Brandon Brown, Sage Karam, Ryan Vargas, Ty Gibbs, Alex Labbé, J. J. Yeley, and Kyle Sieg, with most drivers earning a career best finish.

Background 
Daytona International Speedway is a race track in Daytona Beach, Florida, United States. Since opening in 1959, it has been the home of the Daytona 500, the most prestigious race in NASCAR as well as its season opening event. In addition to NASCAR, the track also hosts races of ARCA, AMA Superbike, IMSA, SCCA, and Motocross. The track's  infield includes the  Lake Lloyd, which has hosted powerboat racing. The speedway is operated by NASCAR pursuant to a lease with the City of Daytona Beach on the property that runs until 2054. Dale Earnhardt is Daytona International Speedway's all-time winningest driver, with a total of 34 career victories (12- Daytona 500 Qualifying Races) (7- NASCAR Xfinity Series Races) (6- Busch Clash Races) (6- IROC Races) (2- Pepsi 400 July Races) (1- The 1998 Daytona 500).

Entry list 

 (R) denotes rookie driver.
 (i) denotes driver who are ineligible for series driver points.

Qualifying 
Qualifying was scheduled to be on Friday, August 26, at 3:00 PM EST. Since Daytona International Speedway is a superspeedway, the qualifying system used is a single-car, single-lap system with two rounds. In the first round, drivers have one lap to set a time. The fastest ten drivers from the first round move on to the second round. Whoever sets the fastest time in Round 2 wins the pole. Qualifying was cancelled due to inclement weather. The starting lineup was determined by a performance-based metric system. As a result, A. J. Allmendinger, driving for Kaulig Racing, would earn the pole.

Race results 

Stage 1 Laps: 30

Stage 2 Laps: 30

Stage 3 Laps: 58*

Standings after the race 

Drivers' Championship standings

Note: Only the first 12 positions are included for the driver standings.

References 

2022 NASCAR Xfinity Series
NASCAR races at Daytona International Speedway
Wawa 250
Wawa 250